Kentucky Route 2155 (KY 2155) is an urban secondary north–south state highway located entirely in Owensboro in northwest Kentucky.

Route description 

KY 2155 begins at an interchange with Wendell H. Ford Expressway (U.S. Route 60, US 60) and US 231 on the south side of Owensboro. It follows New Hartford Road north of the expressway, then follows a one-way couplet. Northbound lanes follow Breckinridge Street, while KY 2155 southbound follows Triplet Street. It intersects Parrish Avenue (KY 54). It continues as a one-way couplet until it reaches East Fifth Street. There, KY 2155 follows Fifth Street until it reaches its northern terminus at the junction with J.R. Miller Boulevard (KY 2262) in downtown Owensboro.

History 
The state originally assigned KY 71 to follow this alignment on Hartford Road, along with the current alignment of KY 298 throughout Daviess County from its 1929 inception until 1952, when US 231 took over all of KY 71's original alignment.<ref
name="transportation.ky.gov"></ref>

The KY 2155 designation came to the road in the 2001–02 fiscal year, when US 231 was rerouted onto the Wendell H. Ford Expressway and US 60 south and east of town to follow a new alignment to the then-new William H. Natcher Bridge into Spencer County, Indiana.

From 2002 until 2011, KY 2155 followed the J.R. Miller Boulevard onto the Owensboro Bridge to terminate at the Kentucky-Indiana state line and the Ohio River. KY 2262 was newly designated onto that route in 2011.

Major intersections

References

External links
US 231 at KentuckyRoads.com

U.S. Route 231
2155
2155